Stephen Várdai (died 22 February 1471) was a Hungarian Roman Catholic bishop and cardinal.

Biography

Stephen Várdai was born in Szabolcs County, Kingdom of Hungary, ca. 1425, the son of nobleman Pelbartus Várdai.  He studied at the University of Ferrara, receiving a doctorate in canon law.

In his early life, Várdai joined the military to fight against the Ottoman Empire.  He later joined the ecclesiastical estate.  He was a canon of the cathedral chapter of Eger from 1451 to 1454.  He spent 1454 to 1456 in the Voivodeship of Transylvania.  In 1456, he returned to Eger in 1456 as provost of the cathedral chapter.  He became Vice-Chancellor of the Kingdom of Hungary in 1456, holding this post until 1458.

In 1457, he was elected Archbishop of Kalocsa, with Pope Callixtus III confirming his appointment on February 23, 1457.

Shortly thereafter, he was sent to the Kingdom of France to negotiate a marriage between Ladislaus the Posthumous and a daughter of Charles VII of France.  This embassy was frustrated by the Hungarian king's death later in 1457.  In 1464, the new king, Matthias Corvinus made Várdai Chancellor of the Kingdom of Hungary, a position he held until 1471.

At the request of Matthias Corvinus and Louis XI of France, Pope Paul II made Várdai a cardinal priest in the consistory of September 18, 1467; his appointment was published in San Marco, Rome the next day.  He received the titular church of Santi Nereo e Achilleo on May 13, 1468.  He was not sent the red hat until February 1471.

He died in Kalocsa sometime between February 22 and 26, 1471.  He is buried in Kalocsa.

References

1471 deaths
15th-century Hungarian cardinals
Year of birth unknown
Archbishops of Kalocsa
Ambassadors of Hungary to France